Coimbatore North Flyover is a flyover in coimbatore. It is built across the railway line connecting coimbatore main junction and coimbatore north junction. The flyover was built to ease traffic congestion.

History
Construction began in August 1991 and ended five years later. Earlier there was a malfunctioning railway gate here, which used to cause huge traffic snarls during peak hours. This flyover was built to replace that traffic gate. It is built across the railway line connecting coimbatore main junction and coimbatore north junction. The flyover was built to ease traffic congestion.

Location
It is located in Mettupalayam Road, Coimbatore.

Gallery

References

Transport infrastructure completed in 1996
Flyovers in Coimbatore